Hotel New Moon (Persian: مهمانخانه ماه نو, romanized: Mehmankhane Mahe No, Japanese: ホテルニュームーン, romaji: hoterunyūmūn) is a 2019 Iranian drama film directed by Takefumi Tsutsui and written by Naghmeh Samini and Jun Kawasaki. The film screened for the first time at the 37th Fajr International Film Festival.

Cast 

 Mahnaz Afshar as Noushin Tavakol
 Laleh Marzban as Mona Tavakol

 Masatoshi Nagase as Takeshi Tanaka

 Ali Shadman as Sahand
 Nasim Adabi as Roya
 Ayako Kobayashi as Etsuko Tanaka
 Maryam Boubani as Noushin's mother
 Javad Yahyavi as Takeshi's translator
 Marjan Alavi as Amanbakht

References

External links 

Japanese drama films
Iranian drama films
2010s Persian-language films
2010s Japanese-language films
2019 drama films
2019 multilingual films
Iranian multilingual films
Japanese multilingual films
2010s Japanese films